Lyle Lovett is an American singer-songwriter and actor. Active since 1980, he has recorded fourteen albums and released 25 singles to date, including his highest entry, the number 10 chart hit on the U.S. Billboard Hot Country Songs chart, "Cowboy Man".

Despite not having charted a Top 40 single since 1988, all of Lovett's 1990's albums were certified Gold by the Recording Industry Association of America.

Studio albums

1980s

1990s

2000s

2010s and 2020s

Compilation albums

Other albums

Live albums

Soundtrack albums

Singles

1980s

1990s — 2010s

Featured singles

Music videos

References

Discographies of American artists
Country music discographies
Folk music discographies